Davi Santos (born 1 February 1990) is a Brazilian-American actor, best known for his role playing Sir Ivan, The Gold Ranger on the television series Power Rangers Dino Charge and Dr. Joey Costa on Good Sam. He is a screenwriter and star of The Cure, a film that world premiered at Cannes Film Festival.

Biography
Santos was born in Rio de Janeiro. In late 1990, Santos' family immigrated to New York City, and he was raised in Astoria, a neighborhood in the northwestern corner of Queens.

Santos attended the Professional Performing Arts School alongside Connor Paolo and Sarah Hyland. He graduated from LaGuardia Arts "Fame" High School. In 2008, Santos enrolled in Macaulay Honors College at Lehman College where he designed the courses of his customized CUNY BA in Cognitive Philosophy and Theatrical Arts. At Lehman he acted in a production of Arthur Miller's A View from the Bridge directed by Susan Soetaert in 2010. Since the age of 8, he has trained in martial arts. He holds a second Dan Black-belt in Shotokan Karate.

Career
With a background in theatre and commercials, Santos appeared Off-Broadway between 2009 and 2012 in plays premiering at New York Theatre Festival, Samuel French Play Festival and the New York International Fringe Festival. In his late teens, he wrote and appeared in the coming of age docufiction, Lone Prophet, utilizing guerrilla filmmaking in support of the DREAM Act. In 2011, he collaborated with Christopher J. Lopez to create Densely Hollow Films. Their first film, The Cure, premiered at the Palais des Festivals et des Congress at Cannes Film Festival.

A self-tape audition led Santos to an appearance on the ABC comedy series Don't Trust the B---- in Apartment 23, after which he joined the cast of the American Sitcom Mr. Box Office for two seasons. He continued making television appearances on Nickelodeon's How to Rock, and ABC Family's Switched at Birth, Mystery Girls and Chasing Life.

In 2014, Santos was cast as Sir Ivan of Zandar, the Gold Ranger on Power Rangers Dino Charge for two seasons. He would reprise the role in two episodes of Power Rangers Beast Morphers, "Finders Keepers" and "Grid Connection". In 2017, he starred in the film Something Like Summer based on the acclaimed novel of the same title. The same year, Densely Hollow Films began principal photography on its feature debut, Adrift, produced by James Manos Jr., in which Santos starred opposite Lauren Velez and Tony Plana. Santos also appeared in the horror film Polaroid, which was released in 2019.

In July 2018, Santos was cast as Gabe for the first season of the CBS All Access fantasy drama series Tell Me a Story which premiered that October.

Personal life
Santos has said he identifies with the LGBT community.

Filmography

Film

Television

References

External links
 
 

1990 births
21st-century American male actors
American male film actors
American male stage actors
American male television actors
Brazilian emigrants to the United States
Fiorello H. LaGuardia High School alumni
American LGBT rights activists
Brazilian LGBT rights activists
Living people
Male actors from Rio de Janeiro (city)
Male actors from New York City
Power Rangers Dino Charge
William E. Macaulay Honors College alumni